Gnagbodougnoa is a town in south-central Ivory Coast. It is a sub-prefecture of Gagnoa Department in Gôh Region, Gôh-Djiboua District.

Gnagbodougnoa was a commune until March 2012, when it became one of 1126 communes nationwide that were abolished.

In 2014, the population of the sub-prefecture of Gnagbodougnoa was 9,981.

Villages
The 7 villages of the sub-prefecture of Gnagbodougnoa and their population in 2014 are :

 Abohio  (406)
 Dalilié  (589)
 Dodougnoa  (1 042)
 Gnagbodougnoa  (3 709)
 Gnamagnoa  (1 622)
 Godélilié  (1 069)
 Kragbalilié  (1 544)

References

Sub-prefectures of Gôh
Former communes of Ivory Coast